Norman Hook may refer to:
 Norman Hook (priest)
 Norman Hook (bowls)